Lacs des Hôpitaux is a pair of lakes at La Burbanche in the Ain department of France. With an area of 17  hectares, it is widely used for recreational fishing and belongs to a fishing association, Aappma Albarine, run by volunteers. The eastern part of the lake, associated with the marsh and the source of Furan, is classified a natural area of ecological interest, fauna and flora.

References 

Hopitaux